Akçataş (literally "quite white rock") is a Turkish place name that may refer to the following places in Turkey:

 Akçataş, Horasan
 Akçataş, Kalecik, a village in the district of Kalecik, Ankara Province
 Akçataş, Kargı
 Akçataş, Kastamonu, a village in the district of Kastamonu, Kastamonu Province